Pea Soup Andersen's is a restaurant chain in Central California that primarily serves travelers. The chain consists of two locations along the state's two major north–south highways: U.S. Route 101 in Buellton and Interstate 5 in Santa Nella. While the restaurants are best known for their pea soup, they serve complete home-style meals. Both locations include a bakery and gift shop and have an associated hotel on the property. The company also markets a line of canned soups.

Cultural References 
In Arrested Development season 5, episode 7, multiple references are made about being stuck in traffic by the restaurant.

History 
The original Andersen's restaurant was founded in 1924 by Anton Andersen and his wife Juliette. Anton Andersen was born in Denmark and had received training in the restaurant business in Europe and New York City. Juliette was born in France. Anton and Juliette purchased property in the small town of Buellton, California, in Santa Barbara County. Buellton and neighboring Solvang were the focus of a colony of Danish Americans and recent Danish immigrants. They opened a small restaurant and named it "Andersen's Electrical Cafe" in honor of their proudest possession, a new electric stove.

When the restaurant opened they served simple fare such as sandwiches, pancakes, and coffee. From the beginning their customers were primarily travelers driving the main highway between Los Angeles and San Francisco (now U.S. Highway 101) — salesmen, tourists and truck drivers. After three months in business, pea soup was added to the menu, which was made from a recipe handed down through Juliette's family. While the restaurant's reputation became known for their good food, Juliette's pea soup was the signature attraction.

In 1928 the Andersens added a hotel and dining room to the cafe on their property. These changes shifted the focus of Pea Soup Andersen's from being just a restaurant to a roadside attraction. With Buellton located along Highway 101, it made Pea Soup Andersen's a convenient stop for travelers heading between Los Angeles and the San Francisco Bay.

In the 1930s their son Robert graduated from Stanford University and entered the business. He nicknamed himself "Pea Soup Andersen", which became the name of the restaurant and business in 1947. He established the tradition of billboards up and down the state of California. He also acquired the rights to a cartoon called "Little Known Occupations", which showed comical chefs splitting peas with a hammer and chisel, and turned them into the restaurant's mascots, "Hap-pea" and "Pea-wee".

In the early 1950s animator and future Gumby creator Art Clokey produced stop motion commercials for Pea Soup Andersen's.

In 1965, the restaurant was sold to actor Vince Evans. He developed a miniature train, aviary, and even a small wild animal park on the property, but they were demolished in 1970 to make room for a Danish-themed motel.

In 1976 the company established a second location in Santa Nella, California, in Merced County near Interstate 5. The property included a restaurant, gift shop, hotel, and gas station, all branded with the Andersen's name. A distinctive feature was a working windmill, attached to the restaurant and visible from the highway, which became a symbol of the company.

During the 1980s two additional short-lived restaurants were opened, in Mammoth Lakes and in Carlsbad near Interstate 5. The Carlsbad location became a TGI Friday's, which closed in 2018; it now operates as the Windmill Food Hall, housing eleven restaurants and a bar, but still features the Andersen windmill, which was repaired in the summer of 2019. There was also a location in Selma, which opened in the 1980s and lasted until 2001. The street it was on, Pea Soup Anderson Boulevard, still bears the name.

After the death of the last Evans in 1980 the restaurants went through multiple ownerships. The two remaining properties, Buellton and Santa Nella, are now owned by Milt Guggia, a Central Coast restaurateur.

In January 2021 the Buellton location was listed for sale, with an asking price of $4.7 million.

Throughout all of the years the restaurant has been in business the menu has offered an option of all-you-can-eat pea soup, now called the "Traveller's Special". In 2012 it was noted that the restaurant sold  of pea soup in a day.

Locations

References 

1924 establishments in California
Brand name soups
Restaurants in California
Restaurants established in 1924
Roadside attractions in California
Tourist attractions in Merced County, California
Tourist attractions in Santa Barbara County, California